Robert Morrow Houston (1842 – 27 September 1912) was a Liberal Party Member of Parliament in New Zealand.

Early life

Houston was born in 1842 in County Down, Ireland. His father was Rev. T. Houston, DD. He received his education at Belfast Academy and Queen's College, Belfast. He emigrated to New Zealand on the Canterbury, arriving in Lyttelton on 10 January 1864. Later that year, he went to Auckland and then worked as a school teacher in Whangarei and Otara. After that, he became a storekeeper in Mangonui.

In 1870, he married Christina Robertson "Tina" Stewart of Auckland. Their son, Andrew Stewart Houston (born 1879), served in the Second Boer War. Another son, Harold Edward Houston (born 1885), died in action in France in 1916.

Political career
He was chairman of the Mangonui Town Board, chaired the Oruaiti District Board, and for 24 years chaired the Mangonui County Council.

He was elected to the  electorate in the 1890 general election, and he represented the seat to 1908, when he retired. In the 1890 election, he contested the electorate against James Trounsen, John Lundon and Joseph Dargaville. Houston, Trounsen, Lundon, and Dargaville received 465, 454, 385 and 352 votes, respectively. He chaired the Native Affairs Committee for 15 years and stepped back from that role in 1906 for health reasons. Whilst he was a strong supporter of Richard Seddon, he was of the conservative end of the liberal spectrum and caused his party whips quite a bit of trouble over the years.

Death
He died at Mangonui on 27 September 1912 aged 70 after a prolonged period of poor health. He was survived by his wife.

References

1842 births
1912 deaths
New Zealand Liberal Party MPs
People from County Down
People from the Northland Region
New Zealand traders
Alumni of Queen's University Belfast
People educated at the Belfast Royal Academy
19th-century New Zealand politicians
Members of the New Zealand House of Representatives
Irish emigrants to New Zealand (before 1923)